18th Street Arts Center is a nonprofit arts center in Santa Monica, California. It was founded in 1988 and is the longest running artist residency center in Southern California. 18th Street Arts Center’s residency program hosts 60 or more American and international artists and curators a year.

History
18th Street Arts Center was founded by writer Linda Frye Burnham and Susanna Bixby Dakin, a visual artist and publisher of High Performance Magazine. In 1988, Dakin purchased the former production studio of Judy Chicago's The Dinner Party and four other adjacent buildings in Santa Monica and launched the nonprofit. In 1998 Dakin sold the buildings to the nonprofit 18th Street Arts Center.

References

External links
18th Street Arts Center website
Collaboration with LACMA

Arts centers in California
Performance art in Los Angeles
Buildings and structures in Santa Monica, California